Falling in Love Again is a 1980 American romantic comedy film directed by Steven Paul and starring Elliott Gould and Susannah York.

The film also features Michelle Pfeiffer in an early role playing a younger version of Susannah York's character.

Plot
 
Harry Lewis grew up in the Bronx, New York with grand ambitions. He married the most beautiful girl in school, Sue, and planned to become an architect.

Years later, Harry and Sue, unhappy now and nostalgic for their past, are living in Los Angeles and running a garment business. An invitation to their high school reunion persuades them to return to their roots, and their lives together are recalled in flashback on the cross-country drive to New York.

Cast
 Elliott Gould  - Harry Lewis
 Susannah York - Sue Lewis
 Kaye Ballard - Mrs. Lewis
 Stuart Paul - Pompadour (Young Harry)
 Michelle Pfeiffer - Sue Wellington
 Twink Caplan - Melinda
 John Diehl - Pompadour's friend
 James Dunaway - Man on street
 Robert Hackman - Mr. Lewis
 Todd Hepler - Alan Childs
 Iren Koster - Piano player
 Marian McCargo - Mrs. Wellington
 Tony O'Dell - Bobby Lewis
 Bonnie Paul - Hilary Lewis
 Steven Paul - Stan the Con
 Herbert Rudley - Mr. Wellington
 Alan Solomon - Max the Brain
 Cathy Tolbert - Cheryl Herman
 Terrence Evans - Beaver

Reception
The film was a box-office failure. The New York Times Vincent Canby in his review of Nov. 21, 1980, gave it an entirely negative appraisal, deriding its "witless screenplay."

Elliott Gould later recalled "“It was a very large score, it was overmusical. It was beautiful. Michel Legrand composed it. I thought there was too much of it. It was the first picture of a very, very young director [then 21 year-old Steven Paul, who also co-wrote]. It was alright.”

References

External links

Falling in Love Again at TCMDB
Review of film at Variety

1980 films
1980 romantic comedy films
American romantic comedy films
Class reunions in popular culture
Films scored by Michel Legrand
Films set in Los Angeles
Films set in New York City
American comedy road movies
1980s comedy road movies
1980s English-language films
1980s American films